The Chiers is a river in Luxembourg, Belgium and France. It is a right tributary of the Meuse.

The source of the Chiers is near Differdange, in Luxembourg. The Chiers flows roughly in western direction, and crosses the border with Belgium and flows through Athus (province of Luxembourg).

It then crosses the border with France, flows through Longwy and Longuyon (Meurthe-et-Moselle) and forms the border with Belgium for a few kilometres near Torgny (in the municipality of Rouvroy). It continues through France, along Montmédy (Meuse) and Carignan (Ardennes).

The Chiers flows into the Meuse at Bazeilles, near Sedan.

The main tributaries of the Chiers are the Loison and the Othain, along with smaller tributaries like the Aulnois.

References

Rivers of Luxembourg
Rivers of Belgium
Rivers of France
International rivers of Europe
Belgium–France border
Rivers of Grand Est
Rivers of Luxembourg (Belgium)
Rivers of Meurthe-et-Moselle
Aubange
Differdange
Rouvroy, Belgium
Border rivers